Gymnotrachelus is an extinct monospecific genus of large selenosteid arthrodire placoderm of the Late Devonian known from the Late Famennian Cleveland Shale of Ohio. The type species Gymnotrachelus hydei was originally reconstructed as physically resembling Selenosteus, with slightly smaller orbits (i.e., having a broad, box-like head). Later specimens led to a reappraisal, and now G. hydei is thought to have a more gar-like or barracuda-like build.

Phylogeny
Gymnotrachelus is a member of the family Selenosteidae of the clade Aspinothoracidi, which belongs to the clade Pachyosteomorphi, one of the two major clades within Eubrachythoraci. The cladogram below shows the phylogeny of Gymnotrachelus:

According to a 2022 Jobbins et al. study, Gymnotrachelus was found to be an outgroup to Heintzichthys and Gorgonichthys.

References

Selenosteidae
Placoderms of North America
Fossil taxa described in 1939
Paleontology in Ohio
Famennian life
Famennian genus first appearances
Famennian genus extinctions